The Wilton Center Historic District in the town center area of Wilton, Connecticut, was established as a town historic district in 1970 and was listed on the National Register of Historic Places in 1992.

Wilton's town center was formed in 1726 when the first meetinghouse was built. That meetinghouse was replaced with a new building in 1738, and finally in 1790 by a third church, the current Congregational Church at 70 Ridgefield Road. That church is the oldest church building in Fairfield County and a central element of the historic district.

The historic district includes examples of Colonial Revival, Colonial, and Federal styles of architecture. In addition to the Congregational Church, some of the specific buildings located in the historic district are: 
 Daniel Gregory House, 11 Belden Hill Road, built c. 1775 
 Original Congregational Church Parsonage, 65 Ridgefield Road, built 1832 
 Old Town Hall, 69 Ridgefield Road, built 1832 
 Nathan Comstock House, 77 Ridgefield Road, built c. 1810 
 Winton House, 80 Ridgefield Road, built 1926 
 Halsey House, 98 Ridgefield Road, built 1934 
 Deodate Davenport House, 108 Ridgefield Road, built 1791

The district includes the Wilton Academy.  The shape of the district is very irregular.

See also
National Register of Historic Places listings in Fairfield County, Connecticut
Wilton Center, Connecticut, a census-designated place

References

External links
Photographs of Historic Buildings, Town of Wilton

National Register of Historic Places in Fairfield County, Connecticut
Federal architecture in Connecticut
Colonial Revival architecture in Connecticut
Wilton, Connecticut
Historic districts in Fairfield County, Connecticut
1726 establishments in Connecticut
Historic districts on the National Register of Historic Places in Connecticut